John Meredith was an American Negro league third baseman in the 1910s.

Meredith played for the West Baden Sprudels in 1914. In three recorded games, he posted five hits in 14 plate appearances.

References

External links
Baseball statistics and player information from Baseball-Reference Black Baseball Stats and Seamheads

Year of birth missing
Year of death missing
Place of birth missing
Place of death missing
West Baden Sprudels players
Baseball third basemen